God Is Good may refer to

"God is good to Israel", Psalm 73:1

Music
God Is Good (Om album)
God Is Good (Don Moen album)
God Is Good!, album by Cody Carnes
God Is Good, album by The Gaither Vocal Band

Songs
"Yes, God is Good", hymn written by John Hampden Gurney
"God Is Good", song by Paul McCartney and Carl Davis from Paul McCartney's Liverpool Oratorio
"God Is Good", song by the Stranglers from Lies and Deception 2002, and compilation Gold
"God Is Good", single by Deitrick Haddon 2005
"God Is Good", single by Regina Belle from Love Forever Shines 2008
"God is Good", single by Carl Carlton  2010

Other
God Is Good, Indian evangelical TV show by Sam P. Chelladurai

See also
"Allah Akbar", or "God is the greatest", similar phrase in Islam
Good God (disambiguation)